Richard G.  Cooke (28 October 1946 – 23 February 2023) was an archaeologist who specialized in the archaeology of Panama and, more generally, the Columbian Isthmus area.

Cooke was born in Guildford, Surrey, southern England.
He studied at Bristol and got his doctorate from the University of London in 1972.

Among his areas of concentration were zooarchaeology and his “Gran Coclé semiotic tradition of  central Panama.  He did extensive research on ancient fishing   He was also interested in Panamanian paleo-ecology, the original settlement of the tropical-forest region of the Americas, the development of agriculture, and general social development in the area.  For some ten years, he led an archaeological project in Cerro Juan Diaz.     His contributions to Central American archaeology were celebrated in a conference held in San José, Costa Rica in 2017: “Tras una Herencia Cultural Milenaria: Contribuciones de Richard Cooke a la Arqueología del Área Istmo- Colombiana.”
Cooke established a reference collection of fauna species of tropical America, for use by archaeologists and others.

A Smithsonian Tropical Research Institute staff scientist for the Smithsonian Institution, he spent most of his career working in Panama.

In 2017, Cooke was designated a Member of the Order of the British Empire.

Selected publications

Sugiyama, Nawa, M. F. Martínez-Polanco, C. A. France, & R. G. Cooke.  "Domesticated landscapes of the neotropics: Isotope signatures of human-animal relationships in pre-Columbian Panama." Journal of Anthropological Archaeology 59 (2020): 101195.

Smith-Guzmán, N.,  & R. Cooke.  “Cold-water diving in the tropics? External auditory exotoses among the Pre-Colombian inhabitants of Panama,” American Journal of Physical Anthropology, doi:SI-659-2018 (2018)

Cooke, Richard, A. Ranere, G. Pearson, & R. Dickau. "Radiocarbon chronology of early human settlement on the Isthmus of Panama (13,000–7000 BP) with comments on cultural affinities, environments, subsistence, and technological change." Quaternary International 301 (2013): 3-22. (2013)

Cooke, Richard G. "Arqueología en Panamá (1888-2002)." Panama: cien años de República (2004).

Cooke, Richard G. "Rich, poor, shaman, child: Animals, rank, and status in the ‘Gran Coclé’culture area of pre-Columbian Panama." Behaviour behind Bones. The Zooarchaeology of Ritual, Religion, Status and Identity (2004): 271-284.

Cooke, Richard G., and Anthony J. Ranere. "Precolumbian fishing on the Pacific coast of Panama." Pacific Latin America in Prehistory: the evolution of archaic and formative cultures (1999).

Cooke, Richard, and Anthony J. Ranere. "Prehistoric human adaptations to the seasonally dry forests of Panama." World Archaeology 24.1 (1992): 114-133.

Piperno, D. R., Clary, K. H., Cooke, R. G., Ranere, A. J., & Weiland, D. "Preceramic maize in central Panama: phytolith and pollen evidence." American Anthropologist 87.4 (1985): 871-878.

External links

Extensive bibliography: Richard Cooke

References 

1946 births
2023 deaths
English archaeologists
People from Guildford
Members of the Order of the British Empire
Alumni of the University of London